Radio Betania (104.7 FM) is a local radio station serving the city of Pilar, Buenos Aires Province, Argentina.

History
Broadcasting since the late 1990s, the station formerly carried a heavy metal format, although it was technically a religious radio station. Around 2003, they began to drop all the secular music, focusing on Christian Contemporary music.

Currently it plays almost entirely religious music, plus a mix of imported programming, such as Enfoque a la Familia (Spanish version of Focus on the Family) and Luis Palau Responde.

Slogan
Estamos aquí, usted, nosotros, y la música de Radio Betania. ("Everybody is here: you, we, and the music of Radio Betania".)

Radio stations in Argentina
Christian radio stations in Latin America
Radio stations established in 1990
Mass media in Pilar, Buenos Aires